Murabbalı mecidiye (English: Apricot Murabba Stuffed Cookies) is a kurabiye from the Ottoman cuisine filled with apricot murabba.

See also 
 Kolach
 Sweet roll
 Fig roll
 Cinnamon roll

References 

Turkish desserts
Foods with jam